The City Development Index (CDI) was developed for the Second United Nations Conference on Human Settlements (Habitat II) in 1996 and measures the level of development in cities. The  United Nations Human Settlements Programme (UN-Habitat) used the indicator to rank cities of the world according to their level of development. The CDI is based on five sub indices: infrastructure, waste, health, education and city product. It was invented by Dr Joe Flood, first Coordinator of the Urban Indicators Program, following a statistical analysis of city indicators data.

Calculating the City Development Index
The City Development Index is calculated according to the formulae in the table below. It has separate sub-indices for Infrastructure, Waste Management, Health, Education, and City Product, which are averaged to form the CDI. Each sub-index is a combination of several indicators that have been normalized to give a value between 0 and 1. Because the variables used to make up the CDI are strongly related to each other, there are a number of ways to calculate the CDI that give almost identical results. For this report, the weightings given to each indicator have been initially calculated by a statistical process called Principal Components Analysis and then simplified. This formulation of the index by and large uses the same formulae as in UNDP Human Development Report (1999), for the Health, Education and City Product sub-indices.

For meaningful ranking of cities, the index requires data that are essentially complete, robust and precise - so not many variables are suitable. All the underlying data had to be checked for accuracy and completeness. Where there were missing data or based on very inaccurate estimates, they were either replaced by data from another national city of similar size, by country-wide figures (or national urban data, if available) or by figures for a nearby city or place at a similar level of development (but only if absolutely necessary). Also, Formal waste disposal or Wastewater treated is taken as zero if not provided. Where City Product was not provided, it was calculated so that City Product x Household size = 0.45 x Mean Household Income (which is similar to the main estimation formula). For most transition countries 0.35 x Household Income is used since, in transition economies, much GDP goes into indirect services and subsidies. The resultant city products must be somewhere in the vicinity of the National GDP per person, otherwise household incomes are presumed incorrect and adjusted.

Calculating the CDI

Subsequently several changes were made to the index by Dr Flood in work for the Asian Development Bank, to include telecommunications data. Other additions have been made by consultants in practical applications.

External links
 UN-Habitat
 City Data Book

See also
 Cities in Motion Index

References

Local government